The League of Socialist Youth of Yugoslavia (SSOJ) was the youth movement, member organisation of the Socialist Alliance of Working People of Yugoslavia (SSRNJ). Membership stood at more than 3.6 million individuals in 1983.

History

The SSOJ was founded as a merger of the League of Communist Youth of Yugoslavia and the People's Youth of Yugoslavia organizations after World War II. Membership in the organization, though not compulsory, was desirable for those wishing to pursue higher education and a career in public service, and typically began after children completed their time in the Union of Pioneers of Yugoslavia at around 14 or 15 years of age. Similarly to the party itself, the SSOJ was decentralized and each Republic of Yugoslavia had a branch of its own. It was one of the five main government sanctioned socio-political organizations of Yugoslavia and sent its own delegates to the Federal Assembly.

In the 1980s, attitudes within the SSOJ began to change its structure, and by the latter half of the decade it helped facilitate a network of alternative social and political opinions within the youth sphere of Yugoslavia. The organization attempted to subvert the growing threat of nationalism while following a liberal approach to social issues. The SSOJ tried to facilitate youth culture by encouraging the promotion of the arts, including literature and popular music styles. Following the dissolution of the SKJ shortly after the 14th Congress in 1990, the SSOJ was disbanded as well.

References

Organizations based in Yugoslavia
Youth wings of communist parties
1948 establishments in Yugoslavia
Youth organizations established in 1948
Youth organizations based in Yugoslavia
League of Communists of Yugoslavia